Raekoja plats is town square beside Tartu Town Hall in the center of the Tartu Old Town in Tartu, Estonia. 

It is a venue for numerous festivals like Tartu Hanseatic Days, and several bars and restaurants locate in the near vicinity. 

The fountain and sculpture "Kissing Students" is located in front of Town Hall Square.

References

External links

Tartu
Squares in Estonia